This is a list of airports in Nevada (a U.S. state), grouped by type and sorted by location. It contains all public-use and military airports in the state. Some private-use and former airports may be included where notable, such as airports that were previously public-use, those with commercial enplanements recorded by the FAA or airports assigned an IATA airport code.

Airports

See also 
 Essential Air Service
 Nevada World War II Army Airfields
 Wikipedia:WikiProject Aviation/Airline destination lists: North America#Nevada

References 

Federal Aviation Administration (FAA):
 FAA Airport Data (Form 5010) from National Flight Data Center (NFDC), also available from AirportIQ 5010
 National Plan of Integrated Airport Systems (2017–2021), released September 2016
 Passenger Boarding (Enplanement) Data for CY 2016 (final), released 4 October 2017

Nevada Department of Transportation (NDOT):
 Public Use Airports (also see archived version from January 2011 with links to airport diagrams)
 Nevada Airport Directory & Pilot's Guide 2008 – 2009
 Nevada Airport System Plan

Other sites used as a reference when compiling and updating this list:
 Aviation Safety Network – used to check IATA airport codes
 Great Circle Mapper: Airports in Nevada – used to check IATA and ICAO airport codes
 Abandoned & Little-Known Airfields: Nevada – used for information on former airports

 
Nevada
Airports
Airports